Yang Shuzi (5 September 1933 – 4 November 2022) was a Chinese engineer. He was born in an intellectual family in Hukou, Jiangxi. After he earned his bachelor's degree at Huazhong Institute of Technology in 1956, he became a faculty member there. His research mainly focused on machinery diagnostics. In 1991 he was elected a member of Chinese Academy of Sciences, from 1993 to 1997 he was the president of Huazhong University of Science and Technology.

Yang died on 4 November 2022, at the age of 89.

References

1933 births
2022 deaths
Educators from Jiangxi
Engineers from Jiangxi
Members of the Chinese Academy of Sciences
People from Jiujiang
Presidents of Huazhong University of Science and Technology
Huazhong University of Science and Technology alumni
Wuhan University alumni